is a railway station in Masuda, Shimane Prefecture, Japan.

Lines 
West Japan Railway Company
Yamaguchi Line

Adjacent stations 

Railway stations in Shimane Prefecture
Railway stations in Japan opened in 1923